Guilherme Boratto (born 1974 in São Paulo) is a Brazilian electronic music producer. In the 1990s, he was a member of Sect.

His debut solo album Chromophobia was awarded the title of Mixmag Album of the Month. Regarding why he chose the name Chromophobia, Boratto said: "The same meaning as monochromatism in architecture, which means simplicity. That’s all. I don’t have a morbid fear of colors at all. But also, I was ironic. My music is really colorful."

He owns the record label D.O.C., distributed by Kompakt. The first artist he signed was the Brazilian electronic duo Elekfantz.

On stage, Boratto uses a laptop equipped with Ableton Live, a JazzMutant Lemur, a monome and an Akai APC40. He sometimes invites a guitar player to join him.

Discography

Albums 
 Chromophobia, Kompakt, 2007
 Take My Breath Away, Kompakt, 2009
 III, Kompakt, 2011
 The K2 Chapter, Kompakt, 2013
 Abaporu, 2014
 Pentagram'', 2018

Singles and EPs

Remixes drum & bass/synthpop 
 Kaleidoscópio - "Feliz de Novo" (Gui Boratto Remix)
 Gunjah - "Rave" (Gui Boratto Remix)
 Kaleidoscópio - "Meu Sonho" (Star Guitar by Gui Boratto Extended)
 Helen Christina - "Canto de Ossanha" (Gui Boratto's Extended Mix)
 Groovetronick vs. Gui Boratto - Sem Mais

Selected minimal/techno remixes

References

External links
 Gui Boratto Official Website 

Brazilian DJs
Brazilian house musicians
Brazilian record producers
1974 births
Living people
Progressive house musicians
Electronic dance music DJs